Highland is a surname. Notable people with the surname include:

Byron G. Highland (1934–1967), American combat photographer
Jacob Highland (1932–2015), American volleyball player
Patrick Highland (born 1841 or 1842), American Civil War Medal of Honor recipient
Ron Highland (born 1947), American politician

See also
Hyland (disambiguation)